Norrsken Foundation is a non-profit, non-religious and non-partisan foundation dedicated to helping entrepreneurs solve the world’s greatest challenges, such as poverty, famine, mental health, pollution and climate change. It has raised several venture capital funds, manages an accelerator program for early-stage startups and operates co-working spaces in Stockholm, Sweden and Kigali, Rwanda. Norrsken was created by Niklas Adalberth, one of the founders of the fintech company Klarna.

History 
Norrsken Foundation was created in June 2016 by Klarna founder Niklas Adalberth, who contributed $20 million to the launch. In December 2017 Adalberth committed an additional $62 million to Norrsken Foundation. That same year, a co-working space of 2400 square meters named Norrsken House was opened in a repurposed tram depot in Stockholm. In 2020 Norrsken House hosted more than 450 entrepreneurs from over 130 companies.

Investments

Direct investments 
After the initial launch in 2016, the co-founders of Mojang, King and Daniel Wellington seeded a $34 million fund. Investments in the companies hosted by the foundation range from $100,000 to $1 million.

In 2019, Norrsken closed a new investment fund, Norrsken VC, that will invest 100 million euros in new companies focused on sustainability. In 2020 the EU invested in the Norrsken fund through the European Investment Fund (EIF), along with Nordic banks Nordea and SEB.

In 2021, Norrsken closed a $200 million Africa-focused investment fund, Norrsken 22, aimed at backing a new generation of African tech unicorns. 

Norrsken is an investor in Northvolt, Einride and Heart Aerospace among other companies.

Private equity investments 
In 2018 Norrsken Foundation partnered with private equity firm Nordic Capital

Co-working spaces 
Norrsken operates Norrsken House in Stockholm, a co-working space for entrepreneurs trying to solve social problems. In 2019, Norrsken announced the construction of Norrsken House East Africa, a co-working space for entrepreneurs in Kigali, Rwanda. Norrsken House Kigali opened to the public in december 2021.

See also 
 Effective altruism

References 

Organizations based in Stockholm
Organizations established in 2016